The Békés County Assembly is the local legislative body of Békés County in the Southern Great Plain in Hungary.

Composition

2019
The Assembly elected at the 2019 local government elections, is made up of 17 counselors, with the following party composition:

|-
|colspan=8 align=center| 
|-
! colspan="2" | Party
! Votes
! %
! +/-
! Seats 
! +/-
! Seats %
|-
| bgcolor=| 
| align=left | Fidesz–KDNP
| align=right| 56,936
| align=right| 53.11
| align=right| 1.74
| align=right| 10
| align=right| 1
| align=right| 58.82
|-
| bgcolor=| 
| align=left | Jobbik
| align=right| 15,394
| align=right| 14.36
| align=right| 6.60
| align=right| 2
| align=right| 2
| align=right| 11.76
|-
| bgcolor=| 
| align=left | Democratic Coalition (DK)
| align=right| 11,486
| align=right| 10.71
| align=right| 4.93
| align=right| 2
| align=right| 1
| align=right| 11.76
|-
| bgcolor=| 
| align=left | Momentum Movement (Momentum)
| align=right| 8,599
| align=right| 8.02
| align=right| 
| align=right| 1
| align=right| 1
| align=right| 5.88
|-
| bgcolor=| 
| align=left | Hungarian Socialist Party (MSZP)
| align=right| 8,323
| align=right| 7.76
| align=right| 6.59
| align=right| 1
| align=right| 1
| align=right| 5.88
|-
| bgcolor=| 
| align=left | Our Homeland Movement (Mi Hazánk)
| align=right| 6,475
| align=right| 6.04
| align=right| 
| align=right| 1
| align=right| 1
| align=right| 5.88
|-
! align=right colspan=2| Total
! align=right| 111,916
! align=right| 100.0
! align=right| 
! align=right| 17
! align=right| 1
! align=right| 
|-
! align=right colspan=2| Voter turnout
! align=right| 
! align=right| 47.11
! align=right| 1.01
! align=right| 
! align=right| 
! align=right| 
|}

After the elections in 2019 the Assembly controlled by the Fidesz–KDNP party alliance which has 10 councillors, versus 2 Jobbik, 2 Democratic Coalition (DK), 1 Momentum Movement, 1 Hungarian Socialist Party (MSZP), and 1 Our Homeland Movement (Mi Hazánk) councillors.

2014
The Assembly elected at the 2014 local government elections, is made up of 18 counselors, with the following party composition:

|-
! colspan="2" | Party
! Votes
! %
! +/-
! Seats 
! +/-
! Seats %
|-
| bgcolor=| 
| align=left | Fidesz–KDNP
| align=right| 60,354
| align=right| 54.85
| align=right| 4.35
| align=right| 11
| align=right| 0
| align=right| 61.11
|-
| bgcolor=| 
| align=left | Jobbik
| align=right| 23,058
| align=right| 20.96
| align=right| 4.28
| align=right| 4
| align=right| 1
| align=right| 22.22
|-
| bgcolor=| 
| align=left | Hungarian Socialist Party (MSZP)
| align=right| 15,794
| align=right| 14.35
| align=right| 9.77
| align=right| 2
| align=right| 2
| align=right| 11.11
|-
| bgcolor=| 
| align=left | Democratic Coalition (DK)
| align=right| 6,360
| align=right| 5.78
| align=right| 
| align=right| 1
| align=right| 1
| align=right| 5.56
|-
! colspan=8|
|-
| bgcolor=#FED500| 
| align=left | Together (Együtt)
| align=right| 4,461
| align=right| 4.05
| align=right| 
| align=right| 0
| align=right| ±0
| align=right| 0
|-
! align=right colspan=2| Total
! align=right| 115,073
! align=right| 100.0
! align=right| 
! align=right| 18
! align=right| 0
! align=right| 
|-
! align=right colspan=2| Voter turnout
! align=right| 
! align=right| 46.10
! align=right| 2.27
! align=right| 
! align=right| 
! align=right| 
|}

After the elections in 2014 the Assembly controlled by the Fidesz–KDNP party alliance which has 11 councillors, versus 4 Jobbik, 1 Hungarian Socialist Party (MSZP) and 2 Democratic Coalition (DK) councillors.

2010
The Assembly elected at the 2010 local government elections, is made up of 18 counselors, with the following party composition:

|-
! colspan="2" | Party
! Votes
! %
! +/-
! Seats 
! +/-
! Seats %
|-
| bgcolor=| 
| align=left | Fidesz–KDNP
| align=right| 70,084
| align=right| 59.20
| align=right| .
| align=right| 11
| align=right| 13
| align=right| 61.11
|-
| bgcolor=| 
| align=left | Hungarian Socialist Party (MSZP)
| align=right| 28,552
| align=right| 24.12
| align=right| .
| align=right| 4
| align=right| 11
| align=right| 22.22
|-
| bgcolor=| 
| align=left | Jobbik
| align=right| 19,745
| align=right| 16.68
| align=right| 
| align=right| 3
| align=right| 3
| align=right| 16.67
|-
! align=right colspan=2| Total
! align=right| 123,371
! align=right| 100.0
! align=right| 
! align=right| 18
! align=right| 22
! align=right| 
|-
! align=right colspan=2| Voter turnout
! align=right| 
! align=right| 48.37
! align=right| 
! align=right| 
! align=right| 
! align=right| 
|}

After the elections in 2010 the Assembly controlled by the Fidesz–KDNP party alliance which has 11 councillors, versus 4 Hungarian Socialist Party (MSZP) and 3 Jobbik councillors.

Presidents of the Assembly
So far, the presidents of the Békés County Assembly have been:

 1990–1998 Imre Simon, Hungarian Socialist Party (MSZP)
 1998–2002 László Domokos, Fidesz–MKDSZ-Gazdakörök
 2002–2006 Zoltán Varga, Hungarian Socialist Party (MSZP)
 2006–2010 László Domokos, Fidesz–KDNP
 2010–2014 Zoltán Farkas, Fidesz–KDNP
 since 2014 Mihály Zalai, Fidesz–KDNP

References 

Local government in Hungary
Békés County